Modern Art - the Best of John Foxx is the title of an 18-track compilation album by British recording artist John Foxx, issued in 2001.

Its issue coincided with the publication of a new album with Louis Gordon "The Pleasures of Electricity" and the re-issue of Foxx's first four solo albums on CD, Metamatic, The Garden, The Golden Section and In Mysterious Ways, all published by Edsel Records. Unlike the previous compilation, Assembly, "Modern Art" is a chronological and fairly straightforward compendium of Foxx's 1980s singles (with the exception of "20th Century" which was a B side) plus a selection of tracks covering musical output since returning to the music scene in 1997. Although the content of the album features output from all of Foxx's musical output to date, including the Cathedral Oceans ambient project, the cover art uses photographs of Foxx from his relatively short Metamatic era.

Track listing
 Underpass 
 No-One Driving
 Burning Car
 20th Century 
 Miles Away
 Europe After The Rain
 Dancing Like A Gun
 Endlessly
 Your Dress
 Like A Miracle
 Stars On Fire
 Enter The Angel
 Sunset Rising
 The Noise
 Nightlife
 Shifting City
 My Face 
 He's A Liquid

Tracks 1-12: all single edits or remixes. This version of "Endlessly" is the original 1982 single version, not the 1983 version featured on the previous Assembly compilation.

"Nightlife" is stated as being from The Pleasures of Electricity, even though said album had yet to be published.

This version of "Shifting City" is the live in the studio version as appears on the "Subterranean Omnidelic Exotour" album.

The final two tracks are previously unavailable 'bonus' tracks, namely My Face, issued in 1980 as a flexi-disc only with Smash Hits magazine, and an alternative version of the Metamatic track "He's A Liquid", quoted as being the B side to Underpass promo-only 12" single.

External links 
 Quiet City - the music of John Foxx
 Modern Art at discogs.com

2001 compilation albums
John Foxx compilation albums